The culture of Georgia has evolved over the country's long history, providing it with a unique national identity and a strong literary tradition based on the Georgian language and alphabet. This strong sense of national identity has helped to preserve Georgian distinctiveness despite repeated periods of foreign occupation.

Although Georgia is a largely traditional society, its culture continues to undergo changes in the 21st century. For example, Georgia is one of the first countries in the world to legalize cannabis for both recreational and medical use.

Culture of Ancient and Old Georgia

The Georgian alphabet is traditionally said to have been invented in the 3rd century BC and reformed by King Parnavaz I of Iberia in 284 BC. Most modern scholarship puts its origin date at some time in the 5th century AD, when the earliest examples can be found.

Georgia's medieval culture was greatly influenced by Eastern Orthodox Christianity and the Georgian Orthodox and Apostolic Church, which promoted and often sponsored the creation of many works of religious devotion. These included churches and monasteries, works of art such as icons, and hagiographies of Georgian saints. In addition, many secular works of national history, mythology, and hagiography were also written.

Ecclesiastical art

Medieval Georgian icons are renowned as being among the finest creations of Orthodox religious art. Notable examples include:
 The Icon of 886 from Zarzma monastery
 The Icon of the 9th century from Tsilkani
 The famous Wonderworking Iberian Icon of the Mother of God (10th century)
 The Icon of the 10th century from Okona
 The Icon of Our Lady of Khakhuli of the 12th century
 The Icon of St. George of the 11th century from Labechina
 The Icon of St. George of the 11th century from Nakipari
 The Icon of the 12th century from Anchiskhati
 The Icon of the 14th century from Ubisa
 The Icon of the 16th century from Alaverdi

Ecclesiastical monuments

Well-known monuments of Georgian Christian architecture include:
 The Georgian Church in Bethlehem (4th century)
 The Church of Gavazi (4th century) in Akhalsopeli (Kvareli district of Kakheti region)
 Akaurta Church (5th century) in Bolnisi district (Kvemo Kartli region)
 Ikalto Monastery complex (5th-7th centuries) (Kakheti)
 Sioni Church (5th century) in Bolnisi
 Monastery of Shio Mghvime (6th century)
 Davidgareja Monastery complex (6th-7th centuries)
 Jvari Monastery in Mtskheta (6th century)
 Anchiskhati Church (6th century) in Tbilisi
 Nekresi Monastery Complex (4th-9th centuries) in Kakheti
 Sioni church (7th century) in Ateni
 Petritsoni Monastery in Bulgaria (11th century)
 The Georgian Monastery (10th century) on the Black Mountain in Syria (now territory of Turkey)
 The Georgian Iveron Monastery on Athos (10th century)
 Svetitskhoveli Cathedral in Mtskheta (11th century)
 Opiza Monastery (10th century) in Tao-Klarjeti (now territory of Turkey)
 Monastery Doliskana (10th century) in Tao-Klarjeti (now territory of Turkey)
 Monastery Otkhta-Eklesia in Tao-Klarjeti (now territory of Turkey)
 Oshki Monastery (10th century) in Tao-Klarjeti (now territory of Turkey)
 Bagrati Cathedral (11th century) in Kutaisi
 Gelati Monastery (11th century) in Kutaisi
 Motsameta monastery (11th century) in Imereti
 Sioni Cathedral (11th century) in Tbilisi
 Alaverdi church (11th century) in Kakheti
 Monastery Samtavro (12th century) in Mtskheta
 Vardzia Monastery (12th century) in Meskheti
 Gialia Monastery (10th-16th centuries) in Cyprus

Well-known Georgian painters were Damiane (13th century), Anania (15th century), Mamuka Tavakarashvili (17th century), etc.

The works of the famous Georgian goldsmiths, Beka and Beshken Opizari (11th century), are outstanding contributions to world art.

Literary and other written works

Important Georgian literary works of the pre-Christian period are: 
 Amiraniani, ancient Georgian folk epos.

Notable Georgian written works from the medieval period include:
 Martyrdom of the Holy Queen Shushanik by Iakob Tsurtaveli (the oldest surviving work of the Georgian literature written between 476 and 483)
 Corpus Areopagiticum, a philosophical and theological work attributed by some to Peter the Iberian (5th century)
 The Life of Saint Nino (8th century) (anon)
 The Martyrdom of Abo Tbileli by Ioane Sabanisdze (8th century)
 The Life of Grigol Khandzteli by Giorgi Merchule (10th century)
 A History of the Georgian Kings ("Tskhovreba Kartvelta Mepeta") by Leonti Mroveli (11th century)
 A History of the Royal House of Bagrationi by Sumbat Davitisdze (11th century)
 Eteriani, a folk epic (c. 11th century)
 Life of the King Farnavaz (anon) (11th century)
 Ustsoro Karabadini (Peerless Karabadini) (11th century)
 Tamariani by Ioane Chakhrukhadze (12th century)
 Shen Khar Venakhi ("Thou Art a Vineyard"), the famous Georgian hymn by the King Demetre I Bagrationi (12th century)
 Vepkhistkaosani (The Knight in the Panther's Skin), a national epic poem by Shota Rustaveli (12th century)
 Abdulmesiani by Ioane Shavteli (13th century)
 Kartlis Tskhovreba (History of Georgia), a collection of old Georgian chronicles (from ancient times to the 14th century)

Culture of Georgia today

Starting from the early 16th century,  although certain aspects of more recent times were already incorporated since the 12th century, until the course of the 19th century, Georgian culture became significantly influenced by Persian culture. Though notably more visibly amongst the higher classes, Persian cultural aspects were incorporated amongst the already existing Georgian columns, especially painting, architecture, and literature. The French traveller Jean Chardin who visited Georgia in 1672 noted that the Georgians of the kingdom of Kartli followed Persian customs. Since many Georgian kings, princes, and nobles were either born or raised in mainland Iran, it is not surprising that Persian cultural aspects spread in Georgia.

During the modern period, from about the 17th century onwards, Georgian culture has been greatly influenced by cultural innovations imported from elsewhere in Europe.

The first Georgian-language printing house was established in the 1620s in Italy, and the first one in Georgia itself was founded in 1709 in Tbilisi.

Georgian theatre has a long history; its oldest national form was the "Sakhioba" (extant from the 3rd century BC to the 17th century AD). The Georgian National Theatre was founded in 1791 in Tbilisi, by the writer, dramatist, and diplomat Giorgi Avalishvili (1769–1850). Its leading actors were Dimitri Aleksi-Meskhishvili, David Machabeli, David Bagrationi, Dimitri Cholokashvili, and others.

In Tbilisi, the Museum of the Caucasus was founded in 1845. In the 1920s, it became the State Museum of Georgia. The Tbilisi State Theatre of Opera and Ballet was established in 1851.

Greatest representatives of Georgian culture of the 19th century were: Nikoloz Baratashvili (poet), Alexander Orbeliani (writer), Vakhtang Orbeliani (poet), Dimitri Kipiani (writer), Grigol Orbeliani (poet), Ilia Chavchavadze (writer and poet), Akaki Tsereteli (poet), Alexander Kazbegi (writer), Rapiel Eristavi (poet), Mamia Gurieli (poet), Iakob Gogebashvili (writer), Simon Gugunava (poet), Babo Avalishvili-Kherkheulidze (actor), Nikoloz Avalishvili (actor), Nikoloz Aleksi-Meskhishvili (actor), Romanoz Gvelesiani (painter), Grigol Maisuradze (painter), Alexandre Beridze (painter), Ivane Machabeli (translator), Okropir Bagrationi (translator), Sardion Aleksi-Meskhishvili (translator), Kharlampi Savaneli (opera singer), Pilimon Koridze (opera singer), Lado Agniashvili (folk singer), Alioz Mizandari (composer), etc.

The first cinema in Georgia was established in Tbilisi on November 16, 1896. The first Georgian cinema documentary ("Journey of Akaki Tsereteli in Racha-Lechkhumi") was shot in 1912 by Vasil Amashukeli (1886–1977), while the first Georgian feature film ("Kristine") was shot in 1916 by Alexandre Tsutsunava (1881–1955).

The Tbilisi State Academy of Arts was founded in 1917.

Georgian culture suffered under the rule of the Soviet Union during the 20th century, during which a policy of Russification was imposed but was strongly resisted by many Georgians. Since the independence of Georgia in 1991, a cultural resurgence has taken place, albeit somewhat hampered by the country's economic and political difficulties in the post-Soviet era.

Cuisine

Georgian cuisine refers to the cooking styles and dishes created by the Georgians. The Georgian cuisine is unique to the country, but also carries some influences from other Caucasian, Eastern European and nearby Middle Eastern culinary traditions. Each historical province of Georgia has its own distinct culinary tradition, with variations such as Abkhazian, Megrelian, Kakhetian, Imeretian, Svanetian, Pshavian, Tushian, Kartlian, Gurian, Meskhian, Rachian and Adjarian cuisines. Rich with meat dishes, the Georgian cuisine also offers a variety of vegetarian dishes.

Georgian cuisine is the result of the broad interplay of culinary ideas carried along the Silk Road Trade route by merchants and travelers alike. The importance of both food and drink to Georgian culture is best observed during a feast called supra, when a huge assortment of dishes are prepared, always accompanied by large amounts of local wine, known to be one of the world's oldest wines, produced in ancient authentic Georgian underground kvevri clay pots (dating 8 century BC). In a Georgian feast, the role of the tamada (toastmaster) is an important and honoured position.

Famous Georgian cultural figures

Some famous Georgian cultural figures from the 20th–21st centuries are:

Actors

 David "Dodo" Abashidze
 Veriko Anjaparidze
 Spartak Bagashvili
 Givi Berikashvili
 Ramaz Chkhikvadze
 Kakhi Kavsadze
 Ipolite Khvichia
 Akaki Khorava
 Zurab Kipshidze
 Avtandil Makharadze
 Merab Ninidze
 Guram Sagaradze
 Karlo Sakandelidze
 Sesilia Takaishvili
 Bukhuti Zakariadze
 Sergo Zakariadze
 Nato Vachnadze
 Sofiko Chiaureli

Ballet dancers

 Nino Ananiashvili
 Vakhtang Chabukiani
 Irma Nioradze

Composers

 Sulkhan Tsintsadze
 Dimitri Arakishvili
 Andria Balanchivadze
 Meliton Balanchivadze
 Alexandre Basilaia
 Gia Kancheli
 Bidzina Kvernadze
 Giorgi Latsabidze
 Zakharia Paliashvili
 Otar Taktakishvili

Filmmakers

 Tengiz Abuladze
 Vasil Amashukeli
 Mikheil Chiaureli
 Revaz Chkheidze
 Otar Ioseliani
 Mikheil Kobakhidze
 Eldar Shengelaia
 Giorgi Shengelaia
 Alexandre Tsutsunava
 Nana Mchedlidze

Opera singers

 Medea Amiranashvili
 Paata Burchuladze
 David Gamrekeli
 Lamara Cekonia
 Makvala Kasrashvili
 Badri Maisuradze
 Vano Sarajishvili
 Zurab Sotkilava
 Nino Surguladze

Painters

 Irakli Parjiani
 Elene Akhvlediani
 David Alexidze
 Gia Bugadze
 Amiran Danibegashvili
 Gigo Gabashvili
 Oleg Timchenko
 Petre Otskheli
 Lado Gudiashvili
 Gia Gugushvili
 Mamuka Japharidze
 Irakli Gamrekeli
 David Kakabadze
 Shalva Kikodze
 Sergo Kobuladze
 Niko Pirosmani
 Levan Tsutskiridze
 Avto Varazi

Pianists

 Alexander Korsantia
 Giorgi Latso
 Alexander Toradze
 Eliso Virsaladze
 Inga Kashakashvili
 Khatia Buniatishvili
 Luka Okros

Poets

 Shota Rustaveli
 Galaktion Tabidze
 Alexander Abasheli
 Irakli Abashidze
 Rati Amaglobeli
Diana Anphimiadi
 Lado Asatiani
 Valerian Gaprindashvili
 Terenti Graneli
 Ioseb Grishashvili
 Paolo Iashvili
 Ana Kalandadze
 Giorgi Leonidze
 Mukhran Machavariani
 David Magradze
 Kolau Nadiradze
 Vazha-Pshavela
 Titsian Tabidze
 Nikoloz Baratashvili
 Ilia Chavchavadze
 Akaki Tsereteli
 Bela Chekurishvili

Sculptors

 Elguja Amashukeli
 Iakob Nikoladze
 Irakli Ochiauri
 George Papashvily
 Zurab Tsereteli

Theatre producers

 Sandro Akhmeteli
 Kote Marjanishvili
 Robert Sturua
 Mikheil Tumanishvili

Writers, male

 Vasil Barnovi
 Lasha Bugadze
 Otar Chiladze
 Tamaz Chiladze
 Konstantine Gamsakhurdia
 Levan Gotua
 Shalva Dadiani
 Guram Dochanashvili
 Mikheil Javakhishvili
 Otia Ioseliani
 Jemal Karchkhadze
 Leo Kiacheli
 David Kldiashvili
 Aka Morchiladze
 George Papashvily
 Guram Rcheulishvili
 Grigol Robakidze
 Avksenty Tsagareli
 David Turashvili
 Nodar Dumbadze
 Terenti Graneli

Cultural groups

Dance troupes
 Erisioni
 Sukhishvilebi - Georgian National Ballet

Choirs
 Rustavi Choir

Sport

 Zaza Pachulia (basketball player for Golden State Warriors)
 Kakha Kaladze (footballer for AC Milan)
 Khvicha Kvaratskhelia (footballer for SSC Napoli)

Rugby union is a popular team sport played in Georgia. Rugby union is considered the second most popular sport in Georgia, after football.

See also
 Outline of culture
 Outline of Georgia (country)
 History of Georgia
 Georgian people
 Georgian language
 Georgian Orthodox and Apostolic Church
 Music of Georgia
 Dances of Georgia
 Keipi
 Kinto
 Architecture of Georgia
List of museums in Georgia (country)

References

External links
 Georgia History and Culture 
 Georgian Web by Besiki Sisauri
 Friends of Georgia International Foundation Information on Georgian Culture & History
 Georgian eBooks Many online Georgian e-books (PDF) on the CD "Anthology of Georgian classical literature" by UNESCO Project
 Authors
 Georgian Art, Tiflis Avenue
 TITUS projects Armazi and Ecling
 Georgia - South Caucasus 
 From the Cradle of Wine
 Kharbedia, Malkhaz: "Conformism and Resistance: The Birth of the Modern Georgian Literature" in the Caucasus Analytical Digest No. 14
 Georgian Contemporary Art Portal 

 
Articles containing video clips